Queens Park in Crewe, Cheshire, is a 44.5 acre (18ha) Grade II* listed public park opened in 1887, little changed from its original plan.

History
The park was laid out by railway engineer Francis Webb, Richard Moon, mayor of Crewe in 1888, and garden designer Edward Kemp.

A story that the park is a product of 1880s railway politics when the London & North Western Railway bought the land and donated it to the town to prevent the Great Western Railway from building a railway line through it is almost certainly untrue.

From 2014 the park underwent a major £6.5 million restoration that included a new children's playground, a new café and bowls pavilion, and significant reconstruction work to bridges and footpaths.

The Friends of Queens Park help to raise money for events held in the park. The Friends are a community group who represent the park, they also raise money to put on events in the Park and to implement new ideas.

Features
The park is a popular spot for the inhabitants of Crewe and features the largest lake in the area, which also has boats for hire.  Other prominent features of the park include a Victorian clock tower, a man-made waterfall, a large playground, and several statues and fountains, including monuments to the British soldiers killed in the Boer War and the first Gulf War and Verdun trees.

Sport
A parkrun takes place at the park each Saturday morning at 9am. It began on 17 February 2018.

See also

Listed buildings in Crewe
List of parks and open spaces in Cheshire

References
Notes

Citations

Crewe
Parks and open spaces in Cheshire